Jat Tehnika is a Serbian aerospace company providing aircraft maintenance, repair and overhaul. The company is based at Belgrade Nikola Tesla Airport and provides services for Air Serbia and other airlines across Europe.

Jat Tehnika is certified to provide full maintenance for the Boeing 737 Classic and Next Generation family, as well as for ATR 42 and 72 aircraft. The company became certified to maintain the Airbus A320 family in 2013.

History
The origins of Jat Tehnika date back to the creation of Aeroput in 1927.

The first technicians and mechanics started working as pioneers of this profession in 1927. Jat Airways was founded in 1947 as the successor of Aeroput. In 1963 a jet engine fleet was introduced. The first wide body DC-10 aircraft arrived in 1978, followed by the new technology aircraft 737-300 in 1984.

In 2005 employees, leader of the company launched a strike that paralysed the national airline Jat Airways for a month. Jat technicians were unhappy with their working conditions and pay. In order to continue safe transportation of passengers Jat Airways brought North African technicians to Belgrade Nikola Tesla Airport which further angered the workers of Jat Tehnika seeing that their needs were being ignored. The Government of Serbia, which wholly owns Jat Airways, separated Jat Tehnika from the parent company in 2006 to end the dispute.

Jat Tehnika received its JAR 145 certificate from the European Aviation Safety Agency (EASA), allowing the company to maintain all aircraft from the European Union, in 2005 which was suspended in 2021. The company obtained a certificate from the American Federal Aviation Administration (FAA) to service airlines from the United States in 2007.

In July 2019, the Government of Serbia announced auction of the company, with plans to sell its 99.4% share in company's ownership. On 28 November 2019, the Government of Serbia accepted the offer of Czech-Polish group "Avia Prime" to take over the company for 10.30 million euros.

Jat Tehnika services

Line maintenance
Line Maintenance Department provides line maintenance services.
Also, it provides operation of line station and main base in Belgrade, as well as line stations and technical bases worldwide.

Base maintenance
Jat Tehnika Base Maintenance offers comprehensive maintenance, repair and overhaul services on Boeing 737 Classic/Next Generation, ATR 42/72 and Airbus A320 family.

Engine maintenance department

Component maintenance department
Component Maintenance Department consists of seven Workshops, Engineering Production Bureau and Support Unit.
Radio Workshop is responsible for maintenance of components from navigation, communications, microwaves and auto flight systems using automatic test equipment to perform more accurate troubleshooting and fault isolation.
Instrument Workshop covers testing, repair and overhaul of various types of sensors, transmitters, indicators, Air Data Computers and Cabin Pressure Controllers. It also has capabilities for maintenance of gyroscopic instruments such as vertical and horizontal gyros. Complete maintenance and readout of Flight Data Recorders is performed in this workshop.
Maintenance of oxygen bottles, crew and passenger oxygen masks together with Passenger Service Units (PSU) is responsibility of Oxygen Workshop which is a part of Instrument Workshop.
Electric Workshop performs maintenance of various control boxes, relays, components from distribution system of electrical power, electrical starters and generators, electrical harnesses, fire detection sensors, batteries and other electrical units.
Pneumatic Workshop is in charge of components from pneumatic, air-conditioning, pressurization, anti-icing, de-icing, engine bleed and engine starting systems.
Hydraulic and Mechanical Components Workshop is divided in two parts. First part is responsible for maintenance of components from hydraulic, flight controls and fuel systems such as actuators, hydraulic modules and various types of pumps. Second part deals with gearboxes and other components from flight controls systems together with all types of fire extinguishers, command cables, pipes and hoses.
Landing Gear workshop covers repair and maintenance of landing gears, wheels and brakes.
Test Equipment and Calibration Workshop is responsible for maintenance and calibration of tools, equipment and test equipment. It has accreditation of national standard institutions and traceability to international standards.
Support Unit provides logistics in documentation and materials flow in whole department.
Engineering Production Bureau is responsible to provide engineering and technological support to workshops from Component Maintenance Department. Its duties are to keep maintenance of components in accordance of latest requirements of manufacturers and relevant authorities.

Engineering department
Jat Tehnika Engineering offers EASA PART 21 Design Organization services, Maintenance Programs Development, Auditing and Consulting services and Contracted Continuous Airworthiness Maintenance Organization (CAMO) services.

Facilities
The base facility of Jat Tehnika at Belgrade Nikola Tesla Airport consists of three equipped hangars. The first is designed for line-maintenance tasks as well as for trouble shooting operations, and can carry up to three medium-size planes each (such as the DC-9 and Boeing 727). There is also one hangar designed for aircraft overhaul which can carry up to three medium size planes (such as the B737-300) including annexes for all aircraft components shop maintenance. The facility also consists of one large aircraft hangar designed for large long-range planes maintenance with space capacity of 9,000 sqm. It is able to fit up to three DC-10s or MD-11s or two Boeing 747-400s.

Approvals and certificates
Jat Tehnika is approved in several countries and aviation authorities for the maintenance of aircraft, engines and components; also holds approvals for PART 21 Design Organisation, Equipment and Tools Calibration and Technical Training. The company has received the relevant certification from the countries/aviation authorities concerned. As of June 2021 the EASA Part 145 approval of JAT Technika has been suspended pending the resolution of level 1 findings

Jat Airways dispute
On 30 September 2009, Jat Airways was forced to suspend operations because Jat Tehnika refused to perform any further work on their aircraft as Jat Airways had accumulated unpaid bills amounting to RSD100,000,000 (€1,000,000 or US$1,450,000).

References

2006 establishments in Serbia
Aerospace companies of Serbia
Aircraft engineering companies
Companies based in Belgrade
D.o.o. companies in Serbia
Technology companies established in 2006